Sweet Nothing in My Ear is a 1998 play in two acts by American playwright Stephen Sachs. Featuring both deaf and hearing characters, it uses a blend of spoken English and American Sign Language. In addition to six main characters, the play calls for four additional company members who voice act the lines which are being signed and sign the lines which are being spoken. This allows the play to be understood by both deaf and hearing audiences.

Plot 
Laura is a deaf teacher; Dan is her hearing husband; Adam is their deaf son. Max is Laura's father, who is deaf; Sally is Laura's mother, who is deaf. Dr. Walters is a deaf therapist. The play follows Dan and Laura as they struggle to decide whether their son Adam should receive a Cochlear implant. The play deals with themes of deaf pride and deaf culture.

Cast 
Sweet Nothing in My Ear was originally produced by Deborah Lawlor and Jesica Korbman for The Fountain Theatre in Los Angeles, June 1997. It was directed by Stephen Sachs, set design by Sets to Go; costume design by J. Kent Inasy; slide projections were created by Evan Mower; and the production stage manager was Jesica Korbman.

The cast was as follows:
 Laura - Terrylene Sacchetti - Voice by Jennifer Massey
 Dan - Bob Kirsh - Voice by John Benitz
 Adam - Gianni Manganelli - Voice by Elizabeth Barrett
 Max - Bernard Bragg - Voice by Cal Bartlet
 Sally - Freda Norman - Voice by Elizabeth Barrett
 Dr. Walters - Vikee Waltrip - Voice by Elizabeth Barrett

In March 1998, it was produced at the Victory Gardens Theater in Chicago by Simon Levy for The Fountain Theatre and MT Productions. It was directed by Stephen Sachs; set design by Sets to Go; costume design by Kristine Knanishu; lighting design by Joel Moritz; sound design by Lindsay Jones; slide projections were created by Evan Mower; and the production stage manager was Meredith Scott Brittain.

The cast was as follows:
 Laura - Liz Tannebaum-Greco - Voice by Jennifer Massey
 Dan - Philip Lester - Voice by John Benitz
 Adam - George Scott Kartheiser - Voice by Elizabeth Barrett
 Max - Chuck Baird - Voice by Cal Bartlet
 Sally - Vikee Waltrip - Voice by Elizabeth Barrett
 Dr. Walters - Ralitsa - Voice by Elizabeth Barrett

Film adaptation 

In 2008 a film adaptation of the play was released, directed by Joseph Sargent and also written by Sachs. In similar fashion to the play, it uses dubbed voices whenever on-screen characters are signing.

References 

American plays
Plays and musicals about disability